"The Tunnel"  is a 1952 short story by Friedrich Dürrenmatt. It belongs to the most important works of Dürrenmatt and is a classic among the surrealistic short stories. With the beginning of the story, Dürrenmatt parodies Thomas Mann. The first sentence is very long and nested. Furthermore, Dürrenmatt's student is in a train and likes cigars – just like the young man in The Magic Mountain (Der Zauberberg).

Synopsis
The protagonist is a 24-year-old student, a fat and cigar-smoking loner, who boards his usual train to reach his university, but surprisingly, when the train enters a very small tunnel, the tunnel doesn’t end. The darkness continues for ten minutes, fifteen minutes, twenty minutes. The student gets nervous, but the other passengers are calm, because they don’t see (or don’t want to see) the imminent catastrophe. The student finds the train conductor, and questions him about what is going on with the train. The conductor is evasive at first, but eventually leads the student to the locomotive, which is empty. The conductor tells the student that the engineer already jumped when he realized what was happening to the train. After a failed attempt to pull the emergency brake, the train gets faster and faster, tipping into an abyss. Finally, the train is heading completely vertically and the falling student lands on the front glass of the still falling locomotive, where he greedily stares into the oncoming darkness. 
The train conductor, ever concerned with duty, asks what they should do, but the student answers: “Nothing (...) God let us fall. And now we'll come upon him.” Later, Dürrenmatt abridged the ending. In the second version, first published in 1978, the last two sentences (one sentence in the German original: "Gott ließ uns fallen, und so stürzen wir denn auf ihn zu") are omitted and the story ends with the word "Nothing".

Interpretation
The racing train could be interpreted as every life that inescapably approaches a catastrophe (death, the unknown). Terror can be breaking in a life without warning, and the people hide themselves behind banality. The last sentence of the story interprets this terror as the will of God, but that does not make the terror clearer.

Another interpretation is the story is a social commentary on the ignorance of society in the face of imminent disaster, as people place unquestioning trust in leaders without concern for where they are being led. The last sentence spoken by the student comments on the fall of the ultimate authority figure, God, and how placing trust in falsely constructed authority will only result in the downfall of society.

Literature
 "Die schönsten Kurzgeschichten aus aller Welt", Band 2, Verlag Das Beste 1976, S.724-733

1952 short stories
Swiss speculative fiction works
Works by Friedrich Dürrenmatt